Tuesday Wonderland is a 2006 jazz album by Esbjörn Svensson Trio (E.S.T.).

Track list
 Fading Maid Preludium  4:10   
  Tuesday Wonderland  6:30   
  The Goldhearted Miner  4:51   
  Brewery Of Beggars  8:22   
  Beggar's Blanket  2:53   
  Dolores In A Shoestand  8:52   
  Where We Used To Live  4:25   
  Eighthundred Streets By Feet  6:47   
  Goldwrap  3:59   
  Sipping On The Solid Ground  4:32   
  Fading Maid Postludium  5:08

Personnel 
Esbjörn Svensson Trio
Dan Berglund – double bass
Magnus Öström – drums
Esbjörn Svensson – piano

Recorded and mixed at Bohus Sound Recording Studios, Gothenburg, Sweden in March 2006. Mastered at Bohus Mastering.

References

2006 albums
Esbjörn Svensson Trio albums
ACT Music albums